Veikko Antero Koskenniemi (8 July 1885 – 4 August 1962) was a Finnish poet born in Oulu.

From 1921 to 1948, Koskenniemi served  as Professor of Literary History at the University of Turku. He was the university's rector from 1924 to 1932. In 1948 he became a member of the Finnish Academy. He died in Turku.

V. A. Koskenniemi is one of Finland's most popular writers. Koskenniemi was well known for his poems, travel books, and essays. He was influenced by Goethe, Runeberg, French Parnassans and Symbolists. He is perhaps best known for writing the lyrics for the Finlandia hymn.

Asteroid 1697 Koskenniemi, discovered in 1940–1941, is named after him.

References

External links
 

1885 births
1962 deaths
People from Oulu
People from Oulu Province (Grand Duchy of Finland)
Finnish male poets
Writers from Northern Ostrobothnia
Finnish literary critics
Finnish translators
University of Helsinki alumni
20th-century Finnish poets
20th-century translators
20th-century male writers
Rectors of the University of Turku